The Berkeley Art Museum and Pacific Film Archive (BAMPFA, formerly abbreviated as BAM/PFA) are a combined art museum, repertory movie theater, and archive associated with the University of California, Berkeley. Lawrence Rinder was Director from 2008, succeeded by Julie Rodrigues Widholm in August, 2020. The museum is a member of the North American Reciprocal Museums program.

Collection

Art 
The University of California art collection began with Flight into Egypt, a 16th-century oil on wood panel by the School of Joachim Patinir gifted to the university by San Francisco banker and financier François Louis Alfred Pioche in 1870. The museum was founded in 1963 after a donation was made to the university from artist and teacher Hans Hofmann of 45 paintings plus $250,000.  A competition to design a building was announced in 1964, and the museum, designed by Mario Ciampi, opened in 1970. Founding Director Peter Selz, formerly of the Museum of Modern Art in New York, served from 1965 to 1973 and played a key role in establishing the museum, championing unorthodox Bay Area artists.

The collection holds more than 22,000 works of art, including Ming and Qing dynasty Chinese paintings, Mughal dynasty Indian miniature painting, Baroque painting, old master prints and drawings, early American painting, African-American quilts, 19th and 20th century photography, Conceptual art, and international contemporary art.

The museum has featured works by Albert Bierstadt, Jonathan Borofsky, Joan Brown, Robert Colescott, Jay DeFeo, Helen Frankenthaler, Paul Gauguin, Juan Gris, Ant Farm, Howard Fried, Paul Kos, Robert Mapplethorpe, Knox Martin, Jackson Pollock, Mark Rothko, and Sebastião Salgado.

The museum also features the MATRIX Program for Contemporary Art. MATRIX has featured artists such as Jean-Michel Basquiat, Louise Bourgeois, James Lee Byars, Sophie Calle, Jay DeFeo, Willem de Kooning, Juan Downey, Eva Hesse, Sol LeWitt, Shirin Neshat, Nancy Spero, Cecilia Vicuña, and Andy Warhol.

In 2009, the museum acquired (as a gift from the artist) 56 paintings and drawings from the Abu Ghraib Series by Fernando Botero. Selections from the series have been regularly included in the museum's annual Art for Human Rights exhibitions.

In 2014, the museum acquired San Francisco collector and dealer Steven Leiber's collection of Conceptual art and art materials, as well as his library of reference and artists' books related to Conceptualism and the Fluxus movement. According to The New York Times, "with the acquisition…the museum and film archive will become one of the world’s most important centers for the study of Conceptual art."

In 2019, as a bequest, the museum acquired the Eli Leon Collection of almost 3,000 works by African-American quilt makers, including more than 500 works by Rosie Lee Tompkins. The collection now accounts for about 15 percent of the museum's art collection. Drawing from the Eli Leon Collection, BAMPFA presented Rosie Lee Tompkins: A Retrospective in 2020; The New York Times called it "a triumphal retrospective" that "confirms her standing as one of the great American artists–transcending craft, challenging painting and reshaping the canon." A subsequent exhibition showcasing the broader Eli Leon Collection is planned for 2022.

In 2021, a gift from the Richard and Mary L. Gray Collection added 15 significant works on paper to the collection, by artists including Guercino, Tiepolo, Guardi, Géricault, Juan Gris, Paul Klee, and Miró.

Film 
The Pacific Film Archive (PFA) was founded by Sheldon Renan, who began screening films on the UC campus in 1966 and was appointed Director of the new PFA in 1967. The PFA specializes in programming films "in a theoretical or critical context—exploring, for example, film noir in the context of the post-war ethos." Lectures by film scholars and visits from filmmakers further contextualize the programming. The archive houses 16,000 films and videos, including the largest collection of Japanese films outside of Japan. The PFA also includes a library and study center, and maintains online catalogs of its films and books and an online database of documentation associated with the films.

Buildings 

The former Berkeley Art Museum building was designed by Mario Ciampi and opened in 1970. The concrete Brutalist building was deemed seismically unsafe in 1997, and iron braces were added in 2001 to improve safety. In 1999, the Pacific Film Archive moved to a temporary building across the street.

In 2008, BAMPFA unveiled plans for a new visual arts center, to be designed by the Japanese architect Toyo Ito and located in downtown Berkeley, across the street from UC Berkeley's main entrance. In 2009 those plans were cancelled. Citing the weak economy and trouble raising necessary funds, BAMPFA decided to retrofit and enlarge (rather than demolish) the former University of California Press printing plant at that site, a 1939 Art Deco building on the California Register of Historic Resources and qualified to be on the National Register of Historic Places.

In 2011, BAMPFA presented the schematic design for the $100 million transformation of the former printing plant into its new home, designed by the New York firm Diller Scofidio + Renfro. Located at 2155 Center Street in downtown Berkeley, the building combines the existing concrete structure with a new metal-clad, skylighted addition that includes several galleries, a 232-seat theater, a store and a learning center. Construction began in 2013. The museum re-opened to the public on January 31, 2016. The building totals 83,000 square feet, with 25,000 square feet of gallery space.

The vacated Mario Ciampi building was added to the National Register of Historic Places in 2014. The building, seismically retrofitted and "reimagined", reopened in late 2021 as the Bakar BioEnginuity Hub, an incubator for biotechnology start-ups, named Woo Hon Fai Hall in honor of the father of a donor, David Woo.

See also 

 List of film archives

References

External links 

 
 Search Art Collection
 Search Film, Video, and Book Catalogs 
 CineFiles Film Document Database (film reviews, press kits, program notes, etc.)

Art museums and galleries in California
Cinemas and movie theaters in the San Francisco Bay Area
University of California, Berkeley buildings
Museums in Berkeley, California
University museums in California
Art in the San Francisco Bay Area
Cinema museums in California
Film archives in the United States
Nonprofit cinemas and movie theaters in the United States
Cinemas and movie theaters in California
Experimental film festivals
Institutions accredited by the American Alliance of Museums
Art museums established in 1963
1963 establishments in California
Buildings and structures completed in 1970
1970 establishments in California
Museums established in 2015
2016 establishments in California
Brutalist architecture in California
Modernist architecture in California
FIAF-affiliated institutions